Ambasamudram railway station (station code: ASD) belongs to the Madurai railway division. It has automated ticket vending.

References 

Madurai railway division
Railway stations in Tirunelveli district